General elections were held in the British Virgin Islands on 17 May 1999.  The result was a victory for the incumbent Virgin Islands Party (VIP) led by Chief Minister Ralph T. O'Neal over the newly formed National Democratic Party (NDP) led by Orlando Smith.

The election was largely notable for three reasons:
 It was the first election in the Territory since 1954 in which Lavity Stoutt, a dominant political force in the British Virgin Islands did not participate; 
 It marked the emergence of the NDP, the first serious opposition to the VIP since the collapse of the United Party in the aftermath of Cyril Romney's resignation as Chief Minister in 1986; and
 It was the first election in the British Virgin Islands where no independent candidates were elected.

Results
The election was largely decided in three key seats: the Third District (which Julian Fraser carried for the VIP by 26 votes), the Sixth District (which Omar Hodge carried for the VIP by 12 votes) and the Eighth District (which Lloyd Black carried for the NDP by 11 votes, with the crucial Penn family votes being split between Andre (running as an independent) and David (running for the VIP) – most years a member of the Penn family wins the Eighth District).  The At-large seats were split equally between the two main parties.  Ethelyn Smith won the Fifth District for the minority party, the Concerned Citizens Movement, where the second placed candidate was former Chief Minister running as an independent, Cyril Romney.

Although the overall vote count was flattering to the NDP this was because they polled well in the At-large seats (where each voter casts four votes).  But most of the Territorial seats were not that competitive, with the VIP winning some seats with huge majorities, the largest being Alvin Christopher's thumping 80.2% of the vote in the Second District.  Conversely, Julian Fraser won his seat in the Third District with the smallest mandate of any candidate – just 228 votes in a three-way contest with a low voter turnout.

Notable candidates who were elected to the Legislature for the first time included future Chief Minister and Premier, Orlando Smith; future Deputy Premier and Minister Kedrick Pickering; future Minister Andrew Fahie; and future Minister and Leader of the Opposition Julian Fraser.  Conversely, Walwyn Brewley suffered the first electoral defeat of his career, and would thereafter choose to end his political career at this point.

Individual territorial seats
Winning candidates are shaded in blue.  The previous incumbent, if any, is indicated in bold.

First Electoral District

Total number of registered voters: 1,140
Total number of votes cast: 687
Percentage of voters who voted: 60.2%

Second Electoral District

Total number of registered voters: 1,023
Total number of votes cast: 603
Percentage of voters who voted: 58.9%

Third Electoral District

Total number of registered voters: 914
Total number of votes cast: 594
Percentage of voters who voted: 65.0%

Fourth Electoral District

Total number of registered voters: 1,091
Total number of votes cast: 728
Percentage of voters who voted: 66.7%

Fifth Electoral District

Total number of registered voters: 1,202
Total number of votes cast: 733
Percentage of voters who voted: 61.0%

Sixth Electoral District

Total number of registered voters: 1,174
Total number of votes cast: 809
Percentage of voters who voted: 68.9%

Seventh Electoral District

Total number of registered voters: 812
Total number of votes cast: 586
Percentage of voters who voted: 72.2%

Eighth Electoral District

Total number of registered voters: 928
Total number of votes cast: 683
Percentage of voters who voted: 73.6%

Ninth Electoral District

Total number of registered voters: 1,239
Total number of votes cast: 931
Percentage of voters who voted: 75.1%

At-large seats

Territorial At-Large Electoral District

Total ballots cast: 6,145
Total rejected ballots: 76
Total votes rejected: 4
Total valid votes: 23,927
Total votes counted: 23,931
Total registered voters: 9,523
Percentage turnout: 64.53%

References

Elections in the British Virgin Islands
British Virgin Islands
General election
British Virgin Islands
May 1999 events in North America